The Crusades were a series of religious wars initiated, supported, and sometimes directed by the Latin Church in the medieval period. The best known of these military expeditions are those to the Holy Land in the period between 1095 and 1291 that were intended to conquer Jerusalem and its surrounding area from Muslim rule. Beginning with the First Crusade, which resulted in the conquest of Jerusalem in 1099, dozens of military campaigns were organised, providing a focal point of European history for centuries. Crusading declined rapidly after the 15th century.

In 1095, Pope Urban II proclaimed the first expedition at the Council of Clermont. He encouraged military support for Byzantine emperor AlexiosI Komnenos against the Seljuk Turks and called for an armed pilgrimage to Jerusalem. Across all social strata in western Europe there was an enthusiastic response. Participants came from all over Europe and had a variety of motivations, including religious salvation, satisfying feudal obligations, opportunities for renown, and economic or political advantage. Later expeditions were conducted by generally more organized armies, sometimes led by a king. All were granted papal indulgences. Initial successes established four Crusader states: the County of Edessa; the Principality of Antioch; the Kingdom of Jerusalem; and the County of Tripoli. A European presence remained in the region in some form until the fall of Acre in 1291. After this, no further large military campaigns were organised.

Other church-sanctioned campaigns include crusades against Christians not obeying papal rulings, against the Ottoman Empire, and for political reasons. The struggle between Christians and Muslims in the Iberian Peninsula was proclaimed a crusade in 1123, but eventually became better known as the Reconquista, and only ended in 1492 with the fall of the Muslim Emirate of Granada. From 1147, campaigns in Northern Europe against pagan tribes were considered crusades. In 1199, Pope Innocent III began the practice of proclaiming crusades against apostate Christian communities, called heretics by the Latin Church. Crusades were called against the Cathars in Languedoc and against Bosnia; against the Waldensians in Savoy and the Hussites in Bohemia; and in response to the rise of the Ottoman Empire. Unsanctioned by the church, there were also several popular Crusades.

Terminology

Accordng to modern historiography the term "crusade" first referred to military expeditions undertaken by European Christians in the 11th, 12th, and 13thcenturies to the Holy Land. The conflicts to which the term is applied has been extended to include other campaigns initiated, supported and sometimes directed by the Roman Catholic Church against pagans, heretics or for alleged religious ends. These differed from other Christian religious wars in that they were considered a penitential exercise, and so earned participants forgiveness for all confessed sins. What constituted a "crusade" has been understood in diverse ways, particularly regarding the early Crusades, and the definition remains a matter of debate among contemporary historians. The meaning of a "crusade" is generally viewed in one of four ways. Traditionalists view Crusades as only those to the Holy Land from 1095–1291. Pluralists view Crusades are military expeditions that enjoyed papal endorsement, including those to the Holy Land before and after 1291, to Northern Europe and Iberia, and against Christians. Popularists focus on the popular groundswells of religious fervour. Generalists focus on the basic phenomenon of Latin holy wars. Most modern Crusades historians consider a combination of pluralism and popularism, which is also the focus of this article.
 
Crusader terminology remained largely indistinguishable from that of Christian pilgrimage during the 12thcentury. A specific term for a crusader in the form of "one signed by the cross", however, emerged in the early 12th century. This led to the French the way of the cross. By the mid 13thcentury the cross became the major descriptor of the crusades with "the cross overseas"used for crusades in the eastern Mediterranean, and "the cross this side of the sea"for those in Europe.
 
The Arabic word for struggle or contest, particularly one for the propagation of Islamwas used for a religious war of Muslims against unbelievers, and it was believed by some Muslims that the Quran and Hadith made this a duty. "Franks" and "Latins" were used by the peoples of the Near East during the crusades for western Europeans, distinguishing them from the Byzantine Christians who were known as "Greeks". "Saracen" was used for an Arab Muslim, derived from a Greek and Roman name for the nomadic peoples of the Syro-Arabian desert. Crusader sources used the term "Syrians" to describe Arabic speaking Christians who were members of the Greek Orthodox Church, and "Jacobites" for those who were members of the Syrian Orthodox Church. The Crusader states of Syria and Palestine were known as the "Outremer" from the French outre-mer, or "the land beyond the sea".

Crusades and the Holy Land, 1095–1291

The Crusades to the Holy Land are the best known of the religious wars associated with the term, beginning in 1095 and lasting some two centuries. These Crusades began with the fervent desire to wrest the Holy Land from the Muslims, and ran through eight major numbered crusades and dozens of minor crusades over the period.

Background
The Arab-Byzantine wars from 629 to the 1050s resulted in the conquest of the Levant and Egypt by the Muslim Rashidun Caliphate. Jerusalem was captured after a half-year siege in 637. In 1025, the Byzantine emperor Basil II was able to extend the empire's territorial recovery to its furthest extent in 1025, with frontiers stretching east to Iran. The empire's relationships with its Islamic neighbours were no more quarrelsome than its relationships with the Western Christians, after the East-West Schism of 1054. The political situation in the Middle East was changed by waves of Turkic migrationin particular, the arrival of the Seljuk Turks in the 10thcentury. Previously a minor ruling clan from Transoxiana, they were recent converts to Islam who migrated into Persia. They conquered Iran, Iraq and the Near East to the Seljuk Empire. Byzantium's attempted confrontation in 1071 to suppress the Seljuks' sporadic raiding led to the defeat at the Battle of Manzikert, eventually the occupation of most of the Anatolian peninsula. In the same year, Jerusalem was taken from the Fatimids by the Turkish warlord Atsiz, who seized most of Syria and Palestine throughout the Middle East. The Seljuk hold on the city resulted in pilgrims reporting difficulties and the oppression of Christians.

First Crusade

In 1074, just three years after Manzikert and the Seljuk takeover of Jerusalem, Gregory VII began planning to launch a military campaign for the liberation of the Holy Land. Twenty years later, Urban II realized that dream, hosting the decisive Council of Piacenza and subsequent Council of Clermont in November 1095, resulting in the mobilization of Western Europe to go to the Holy Land. Byzantine emperor Alexios I Komnenos, worried about the continued advances of the Seljuks, sent envoys to these councils asking Urban for aid against the invading Turks. Urban talked of the violence of Europe and the necessity of maintaining the Peace of God; about helping Byzantium; about the crimes being committed against Christians in the east; and about a new kind of war, an armed pilgrimage, and of rewards in heaven, where remission of sins was offered to any who might die in the undertaking. The enthusiastic crowd responded with cries of Deus lo volt!"God wills it!"
 
Immediately after Urban's proclamation, the French priest Peter the Hermit led thousands of mostly poor Christians out of Europe in what became known as the People's Crusade. In transit through Germany, these Crusaders spawned German bands who massacred Jewish communities in what became known as the Rhineland massacres. They were destroyed in 1096 when the main body of Crusaders was annihilated at the battle of Civetot.
 
In response to Urban's call, members of the high aristocracy from Europe took the cross. Foremost amongst these was the elder statesman Raymond IV of Toulouse, who with bishop Adhemar of Le Puy commanded southern French forces. Other armies included: one led by Godfrey of Bouillon and his brother Baldwin of Boulogne; forces led by Bohemond of Taranto and his nephew Tancred; and contingents under Robert Curthose, Stephen of Blois, Hugh of Vermandois, and Robert II of Flanders. The armies travelled to Byzantium where they were cautiously welcomed by the emperor.
 
Alexios persuaded many of the princes to pledge allegiance to him. He also convinced them their first objective should be Nicaea. Buoyed by their success at Civetot, the over-confident Seljuks left the city unprotected, thus enabling its capture after the siege of Nicaea in May–June 1097. The first experience of Turkish tactics occurred when a force led by Bohemond and Robert was ambushed at battle of Dorylaeum in July 1097. The Normans resisted for hours before the arrival of the main army caused a Turkish withdrawal.
 
The Crusader army marched to the former Byzantine city of Antioch, which had been in Muslim control since 1084. The Crusaders began the siege of Antioch in October 1097 and fought for eight months to a stalemate. Finally, Bohemond persuaded a guard in the city to open a gate. The Crusaders entered, massacring the Muslim inhabitants as well as many Christians. A force to recapture the city was raised by Kerbogha, the Seljuk atabeg of Mosul.
 
The discovery of the Holy Lance by mystic Peter Bartholomew may have boosted the morale of the Crusaders. The Byzantines did not march to the assistance of the Crusaders. Instead, Alexius retreated from Philomelium. The Greeks were never truly forgiven for this perceived betrayal. The Crusaders attempted to negotiate surrender but were rejected. Bohemond recognised that the only remaining option was open combat and launched a counterattack. Despite superior numbers, the Muslims retreated and abandoned the siege.
 
Raymond besieged Arqa in mid-February 1099 and the crusaders sent an embassy to the vizier of Egypt seeking a treaty. When Adhemar died after Antioch, there was no spiritual leader of the crusade and the discovery of the Holy Lance provoked accusations of fraud among the clerical factions. On 8 April 1099, Arnulf of Chocques, chaplain to Robert Curthose, challenged Bartholomew to an ordeal by fire. Peter underwent the ordeal and died after days of agony from his wounds, which discredited the Holy Lance as a fake. Raymond lifted the siege of Arqa in May without capturing the town and the crusade proceeded south along the Mediterranean coast. Bohemond remained in Antioch, retaining the city, despite his pledge to return it to Byzantine control, while Raymond led the remaining army. Local rulers offered little resistance. They opted for peace in return for providing provisions. The Frankish emissaries rejoined the army accompanied by representatives from Egypt. This brought added information: the Egyptians had recaptured Jerusalem from the Seljuks. The Franks offered to partition conquered territory in return for rights to the city. When the offer was refused, it became advantageous if the crusade could reach Jerusalem before the Egyptians reinforced its defences and raised a defensive army.
 
On 7 June 1099, the Crusaders reached Jerusalem. Many Crusaders wept upon seeing the city they had journeyed so long to reach. An initial attack on the city failed, and the siege of Jerusalem of 1099 became a stalemate, until they breached the walls on 15 July 1099. Iftikhar al-Dawla, the commander of the garrison, struck a deal with Raymond, surrendering the citadel in return for being granted safe passage to Ascalon. For two days the Crusaders massacred the inhabitants and pillaged the city. Jerusalem had been returned to Christian rule. Urban II died on 29 July 1099, fourteen days after the fall of Jerusalem to the Crusaders, but before news of the event had reached Italy. He was succeeded by Paschal II.
 
On July 22, 1099, a council was held in the Church of the Holy Sepulchre and Godfrey of Bouillon took the leadership, not called king but rather with the title Advocatus Sancti Sepulchri (Defender of the Holy Sepulchre). At this point, most Crusaders considered their pilgrimage complete and returned to Europe. Godfrey was left with a small forcea mere 300 knights and 2,000 foot soldiersto defend the kingdom. In August 1099, the Franks defeated an Egyptian relief force at the battle of Ascalon. The First Crusade thus ended successfully and resulted in the creation of the Kingdom of Jerusalem.

The Kingdom of Jerusalem, 1099–1147

Godfrey of Bouillon died on 18 July 1100, likely from typhoid. The news of his death was met with mourning in Jerusalem. He was lying in state for five days, before his burial at the Church of the Holy Sepulchre. The Jerusalem knights offered the kingdom to Godfrey's brother Baldwin I of Jerusalem, then Count of Edessa. Godfrey's last battle, the siege of Arsuf, would be completed by Baldwin in April 1101. Meanwhile, Dagobert of Pisa, now Latin Patriarch of Jerusalem, made the same offer to Bohemond, and asking that he prevent Baldwin's expected travel to Jerusalem. But the letter was intercepted and Bohemond was captured with Richard of Salerno by the Danishmends after the battle of Melitene in August 1100. Baldwin I was crowned as the first king of Jerusalem on Christmas Day 1100 by Dagobert at the Church of the Nativity. Baldwin's cousin Baldwin of Bourcq, later his successor as Baldwin II, was named Count of Edessa, and Tancred became regent of Antioch during Bohemond's captivity, lasting through 1103.

Crusade of 1101
The Crusade of 1101 was initiated by Paschal II when he learned of the precarious position of the remaining forces in the Holy Land. The host consisted of four separate armies, sometimes regarded as a second wave following the First Crusade. The first army was Lombardy, led by Anselm, archbishop of Milan. They were joined by a force led by Conrad, constable to the German emperor, Henry IV. A second army, the Nivernois, was commanded by William II of Nevers. The third group from northern France was led by Stephen of Blois and Stephen of Burgundy. They were joined by Raymond of Saint-Gilles, now in the service of the emperor. The fourth army was led by William IX of Aquitaine and Welf IV of Bavaria. The Crusaders faced their old enemy Kilij Arslan and his Seljuk forces first met the Lombard and French contingents in August 1101 at the Battle of Mersivan, with the crusader camp captured. The Nivernois contingent was decimated that same month at Heraclea, with nearly the entire force wiped out, except for the count William and a few of his men. The Aquitainians and Bavarians reached Heraclea in September where again the Crusaders were massacred. The Crusade of 1101 was a total disaster both militarily and politically, showing the Muslims that the Crusaders were not invincible.

Establishment of the kingdom
The reign of Baldwin I began in 1100 and oversaw the consolidation of the kingdom in the face of enemies to the north, the Seljuks, and the Fatimids to the south. Al-Afdal Shahanshah, the powerful Fatimid vizier, anxious to recover the lands lost to the Franks, initiated the First Battle of Ramla on 7 September 1101 in which his forces were narrowly defeated, by those of Baldwin I. On 17 May 1102, the Crusaders were not so lucky, suffering a major defeat at the hands of the Fatimids, under the command of al-Afdal's son Sharaf al-Ma'ali at the Second Battle of Ramla. Among the slain were veterans of the Crusade of 1101, Stephen of Blois and Stephen of Burgundy. Conrad of Germany fought so valiantly that his attackers offered to spare his life if he surrendered. The kingdom was on the verge of collapse after the defeat, recovering after the successful Battle of Jaffa on 27 May. In the north, the siege of Tripoli was begun, not to be resolved for seven years. Al-Afdal tried once more in the Third Battle of Ramla in August 1105 and was defeated. After the Crusader victory at the siege of Beirut in 1110, the Fatimid threat to the kingdom subsided for two decades.

The Battle of Harran was fought in 1104, pitting the Crusader states of Edessa and Antioch against Jikirmish, who had replaced Kerbogha as atabeg of Mosul, and Sökmen, commander of the Seljuk forces. The ensuing Seljuk victory also resulted in the capture of Baldwin of Bourcq, then count of Edessa and later king of Jerusalem, and his cousin Joscelin of Courtenay. A Turkish adventurer Jawali Saqawa killed Jikirmish in 1106, seizing Mosul and his hostage Baldwin. Separately freed, Joscelin began negotiations with Jawali for Baldwin's release. Expelled from Mosul by Mawdud, Jawali fled with his hostage to the fortress of Qal'at Ja'bar. Jawali, in need of allies against Mawdud, accepted Joscelin's offer, releasing Baldwin in the summer of 1108.

After Bohemond was ransomed in 1103, he had resumed control of Antioch and continued the conflict with the Byzantine empire. The Byzantines had taken advantage of Bohemond's absence, retaking lands lost. Bohemond returned to Italy on late 1104 to recruit allies and gather supplies. Tancred again assumed leadership in Antioch, successfully defeating the Seljuks at the Battle of Artah in 1105, threatening Aleppo. In the meantime, his uncle began what is known as Bohemond's Crusade (or the Crusade of 1107–1108). Bohemond crossed into the Balkans and began the failed siege of Dyrrhachium. The subsequent Treaty of Devol of 1108 forced Bohemond to become vassal to the emperor, restore taken lands and other onerous terms. Bohemond never returned. He died in 1111, leaving Tancred as regent to his son Bohemond II, who ignored the treaty.

The Norwegian Crusade also known as the Crusade of Sigurd Jorsalfar, king of Norway, took place from 1107 to 1110. More of a pilgrimage than a crusade, it did include the participation in military action at the siege of Sidon of 1110. Baldwin's army besieged the city by land, while the Norwegians came by sea, and the victorious Crusaders gave similar terms of surrender as given to previous victories at Arsuf in 1102 and at the siege of Acre of 1100–1104, freeing the major port of the kingdom. This Crusade marked the first time a European king visited the Holy Land.

Beginning in 1110, the Seljuks launched a series of attacks on the Crusader states, in particular Edessa, led by Mawdud. These included the Battle of Shaizar in 1111, a stalemate. At the Battle of al-Sannabra of 1113, a Crusader army led by Baldwin I was defeated by a Muslim army led by Mawdud and Toghtekin, atabeg of Damascus, whose ultimate objective was Edessa. Mawdud was unable to annihilate the Crusader forces and was soon murdered by Assassins. Bursuq ibn Bursuq took command of the failed attempt against Edessa in 1114. Finally, Roger of Salerno routed the last Seljuk invading army at the First Battle of Tell Danith on 14 September 1115.

Baldwin I died on 2 April 1118 after an attack on the city of Pelusium on the Nile. He was buried in Jerusalem. Baldwin II of Jerusalem became king on 14 April 1118, but there was not a formal coronation until Christmas Day 1119 due to issues concerning his wife Morphia of Melitene. The early days of Baldwin II's reign included the Battle of Ager Sanguinis, the Field of Blood, on 28 June 1119. At Ager Sanguinis, an army led by Ilghazi annihilated the Antiochian forces led by Roger of Salerno who was killed during the battle. The Muslim victory was short-lived, with Baldwin II and Pons of Tripoli narrowly defeating Ilghazi's army at the Second Battle of Tell Danith on 14 August 1119.

On 16 January 1120, Baldwin II and the new patriarch Warmund of Jerusalem held the Council of Nablus, establishing a rudimentary set of rules for governing the kingdom now known as the assizes of Jerusalem. The formal establishment of the Knights Templar was likely also granted by the council, complementing the military arm of the Knights Hospitaller that was protecting pilgrims to the Holy Land. Both military orders were accumulating holdings in the kingdom and Crusader states, with the Hospitallers eventually obtaining the famous Krak des Chevaliers, an important military and administrative center.

The Venetian Crusade, also known as the Crusade of Calixtus II, was conducted from 1122 to 1124. The Western participants included those from the Republic of Venice as well as Pons of Tripoli. The actions resulted in the successful siege of Tyre, taking the city from the Damascene atabeg Toghtekin. This marked a major victor for Baldwin II prior to his second captivity in 1123.

In 1123, Baldwin II led a raid to Sarūj in order to rescue hostages held by Belek Ghazi and was also captured. Belek died in May 1124 and Baldwin II was seized by Ilghazi's son, Timurtash, who commenced negotiations for Baldwin's release. After a portion of the ransom was paid, additional hostages, to include Baldwin's youngest daughter Jovetta, were provided secure the payment of the balance, Baldwin II was released from the Citadel of Aleppo on 29 August 1124. Jovetta was held by il-Bursuqi and were ransomed by Baldwin II in 1125 using his spoils from the Battle of Azaz of 1125.

Toghtekin died in February 1128, and Baldwin II began the Crusade of 1129, also known as the Damascus Crusade, shortly thereafter. The objective was Damascus, now led by the new atabeg Taj al-Muluk Buri, the son of Toghtekin. The Crusaders were able to capture the town of Banias, but were unable to take Damascus despite coming within six miles of the town.

Baldwin II and Morphia married their eldest daughter Melisende of Jerusalem to Fulk V of Anjou in 1129 in anticipation of a royal succession. Baldwin II fell ill in Antioch and died on 21 August 1131. Fulk and Melisende were crowned joint rulers of Jerusalem on 14 September 1131 in the same church where Baldwin II had been laid to rest. Fulk assumed full control of the government, excluding Melisende, as he favored fellow Angevins to the native nobility.

The rise of Zengi
At the same time, the advent of Imad ad-Din Zengi saw the Crusaders threatened by a Muslim ruler who would introduce jihad to the conflict, joining the powerful Syrian emirates in a combined effort against the Franks. He became atabeg of Mosul in September 1127 and used this to expand his control to Aleppo in June 1128. In 1135, Zengi moved against Antioch and, when the Crusaders failed to put an army into the field to oppose him, he captured several important Syrian town. He defeated Fulk at the Battle of Ba'rin of 1137, seizing Ba'rin Castle.

In 1137, Zengi invaded Tripoli, killing the count Pons of Tripoli. Fulk intervened, but Zengi's troops captured Pons' successor Raymond II of Tripoli, and besieged Fulk in the border castle of Montferrand. Fulk surrendered the castle and paid Zengi a ransom for his and Raymond's freedom. John II Komnenos, emperor since 1118, reasserted Byzantine claims to Cilicia and Antioch, compelling Raymond of Poitiers to give homage. In April 1138, the Byzantines and Franks jointly besieged Aleppo and, with no success, began the Siege of Shaizar, abandoning it a month later.

On 13 November 1143, while the royal couple were in Acre, Fulk was killed in a hunting accident. On Christmas Day 1143, their son Baldwin III of Jerusalem was crowned co-ruler with his mother. That same year, having prepared his army for a renewed attack on Antioch, John II Komnenos went hunting wild boar, cutting himself with a poisoned arrow. He died on 8 April 1143 and was succeeded as emperor by his son Manuel I Komnenos.

Following John's death, the Byzantine army withdrew, leaving Zengi unopposed. Fulk's death later in the year left Joscelin II of Edessa with no powerful allies to help defend Edessa. Zengi came north to begin the first siege of Edessa, arriving on 28 November 1144. The city had been warned of his arrival and was prepared for a siege, but there was little they could do. Zengi realized there was no defending force and surrounded the city. The walls collapsed on 24 December 1144. Zengi's troops rushed into the city, killing all those who were unable to flee. All the Frankish prisoners were executed, but the native Christians were allowed to live. The Crusaders were dealt their first major defeat.

Zengi was assassinated by a slave on 14 September 1146 and was succeeded in the Zengid dynasty by his son Nūr-ad-Din. The Franks recaptured the city during the Second Siege of Edessa of 1146 by stealth but could not take or even properly besiege the citadel. After a brief counter-siege, Nūr-ad-Din took the city. The men were massacred, with the women and children enslaved, and the walls razed.

Second Crusade

The fall of Edessa caused great consternation in Jerusalem and Western Europe, tempering the enthusiastic success of the First Crusade. Calls for a new crusadethe Second Crusadewere immediate, and was the first to be led by European kings. Concurrent campaigns as part of the Reconquista and Northern Crusades are also sometimes associated with this Crusade. The aftermath of the Crusade saw the Muslim world united around Saladin, leading to the fall of Jerusalem.

The Second Crusade 
Eugene III, recently elected pope, issued the bull Quantum praedecessores in December 1145 calling for a new crusade, one that would be more organized and centrally controlled than the First. The armies would be led by the strongest kings of Europe and a route that would be pre-planned. The pope called on Bernard of Clairvaux to preach the Second Crusade, granting the same indulgences which had accorded to the First Crusaders. Among those answering the call were by two European kings, Louis VII of France and Conrad III of Germany. Louis, his wife, Eleanor of Aquitaine, and many princes and lords prostrated themselves at the feet of Bernard in order to take the cross. Conrad and his nephew Frederick Barbarossa also received the cross from the hand of Bernard.

Conrad III and the German contingent planned to leave for the Holy Land at Easter, but did not depart until May 1147. When the German army began to cross Byzantine territory, emperor Manuel I had his troops posted to ensure against trouble. A brief Battle of Constantinople in September ensued, and their defeat at the emperor's hand convinced the Germans to move quickly to Asia Minor. Without waiting for the French contingent, Conrad III engaged the Seljuks of Rûm under sultan Mesud I, son and successor of Kilij Arslan, the nemesis of the First Crusade. Mesud and his forces almost totally destroyed Conrad's contingent at the Second Battle of Dorylaeum on 25 October 1147.

The French contingent departed in June 1147. In the meantime, Roger II of Sicily, an enemy of Conrad's, had invaded Byzantine territory. Manuel I needed all his army to counter this force, and, unlike the armies of the First Crusade, the Germans and French entered Asia with no Byzantine assistance. The French met the remnants of Conrad's army in northern Turkey, and Conrad joined Louis's force. They fended off a Seljuk attack at the Battle of Ephesus on 24 December 1147. A few days later, they were again victorious at the Battle of the Meander. Louis was not as lucky at the Battle of Mount Cadmus on 6 January 1148 when the army of Mesud inflicted heavy losses on the Crusaders. Shortly thereafter, they sailed for Antioch, almost totally destroyed by battle and sickness.

The Crusader army arrived at Antioch on 19 March 1148 with the intent on moving to retake Edessa, but Baldwin III of Jerusalem and the Knights Templar had other ideas. The Council of Acre was held on 24 June 1148, changing the objective of the Second Crusade to Damascus, a former ally of the kingdom that had shifted its allegiance to that of the Zengids. The Crusaders fought the Battle of Bosra with the Damascenes in the summer of 1147, with no clear winner. Bad luck and poor tactics of the Crusaders led to the disastrous five-day siege of Damascus from 24 to 28 July 1148. The barons of Jerusalem withdrew support and the Crusaders retreated before the arrival of a relief army led by Nūr-ad-Din. Morale fell, hostility to the Byzantines grew and distrust developed between the newly arrived Crusaders and those that had made the region their home after the earlier crusades. The French and German forces felt betrayed by the other, lingering for a generation due to the defeat, to the ruin of the Christian kingdoms in the Holy Land.

In the spring of 1147, Eugene III authorized the expansion of his mission into the Iberian peninsula, equating these campaigns against the Moors with the rest of the Second Crusade. The successful Siege of Lisbon, from 1 July to 25 October 1147, was followed by the six-month siege of Tortosa, ending on 30 December 1148 with a defeat for the Moors. In the north, some Germans were reluctant to fight in the Holy Land while the pagan Wends were a more immediate problem. The resulting Wendish Crusade of 1147 was partially successful but failed to convert the pagans to Christianity.

The disastrous performance of this campaign in the Holy Land damaged the standing of the papacy, soured relations between the Christians of the kingdom and the West for many years, and encouraged the Muslims of Syria to even greater efforts to defeat the Franks. The dismal failures of this Crusade then set the stage for the fall of Jerusalem, leading to the Third Crusade.

Nūr-ad-Din and the rise of Saladin 
In the first major encounter after the Second Crusade, Nūr-ad-Din's forces then destroyed the Crusader army at the Battle of Inab on 29 June 1149. Raymond of Poitiers, as prince of Antioch, came to the aid of the besieged city. Raymond was killed and his head was presented to Nūr-ad-Din, who forwarded it to the caliph al-Muqtafi in Baghdad. In 1150, Nūr-ad-Din defeated Joscelin II of Edessa for a final time, resulting in Joscelin being publicly blinded, dying in prison in Aleppo in 1159. Later that year, at the Battle of Aintab, he tried but failed to prevent Baldwin III's evacuation of the residents of Turbessel. The unconquered portions of the County of Edessa would nevertheless fall to the Zengids within a few years. In 1152, Raymond II of Tripoli became the first Frankish victim of the Assassins. Later that year, Nūr-ad-Din captured and burned Tortosa, briefly occupying the town, before it was taken by the Knights Templar as a military headquarters.

After the Siege of Ascalon ended on 22 August 1153 with a Crusader victory and Damascus was taken by Nūr-ad-Din the next year, uniting all of Syria under Zengid rule. In 1156, Baldwin III was forced into a treaty with Nūr-ad-Din, and later entered into an alliance with the Byzantine Empire. On 18 May 1157, Nūr-ad-Din began a siege on the Knights Hospitaller contingent at Banias, with the Grand Master Bertrand de Blanquefort captured. Baldwin III was able to break the siege, only to be ambushed at Jacob's Ford in June. Reinforcements from Antioch and Tripoli were able to relieve the besieged Crusaders. Bertrand's captivity lasted until 1159, when emperor Manuel I negotiated an alliance with Nūr-ad-Din against the Seljuks.

Baldwin III died on 10 February 1163, and Amalric of Jerusalem was crowned as king of Jerusalem eight days later. He undertook a series of four invasions of Egypt from 1163 to 1169, taking advantage of weaknesses of the Fatimids. Nūr-ad-Din's intervention in the first invasion allowed his general Shirkuh, accompanied by his nephew Saladin, to enter Egypt. Shawar, the deposed vizier to the Fatimid caliph al-Adid, allied with Amalric I, attacking Shirkuh at the second siege of Bilbeis beginning in August 1164, following Amalric's unsuccessful first siege in September 1163. This action left the Holy Land lacking in defenses, and Nūr-ad-Din defeated a Crusader forces at the Battle of Harim in August 1164, capturing most of the Franks' leaders.

After the sacking of Bilbeis, the Crusader-Egyptian force was to meet Shirkuh's army in the indecisive Battle of al-Babein on 18 March 1167. In 1169, both Shawar and Shirkuh died, and al-Adid appointed Saladin as vizier. Saladin, with reinforcements from Nūr-ad-Din, defeated a massive Crusader-Byzantine force at the siege of Damietta in late October. This gained Saladin the attention of the Assassins, with attempts on his life in January 1175 and again on 22 May 1176.

Baldwin IV of Jerusalem became king on 5 July 1174 at the age of 13. As a leper he was not expected to live long, and served with a number of regents, and served as co-ruler with his cousin Baldwin V of Jerusalem beginning in 1183. Baldwin IV, Raynald of Châtillon and the Knights Templar defeated Saladin at the celebrated Battle of Montgisard on 25 November 1177. In June 1179, the Crusaders were defeated at the Battle of Marj Ayyub, and in August the unfinished castle at Jacob's Ford fell to Saladin, with the slaughter of half its Templar garrison. However, the kingdom repelled his attacks at the Battle of Belvoir Castle in 1182 and later in the Siege of Kerak of 1183.

The fall of Jerusalem 
Baldwin V became sole king upon the death of his uncle in 1185 under the regency of Raymond III of Tripoli. Raymond negotiated a truce with Saladin which went awry when the king died in the summer of 1186. His mother Sibylla of Jerusalem and her husband Guy of Lusignan were crowned as queen and king of Jerusalem in the summer of 1186, shortly thereafter. They immediately had to deal with the threat posed by Saladin.

Despite his defeat at the Battle of al-Fule in the fall of 1183, Saladin increased his attacks against the Franks, leading to their defeat at the Battle of Cresson on 1 May 1187. Guy of Lusignan responded by raising the largest army that Jerusalem had ever put into the field. Saladin lured this force into inhospitable terrain without water supplies and routed them at the Battle of Hattin on 4 July 1187. One of the major commanders was Raymond III of Tripoli who saw his force slaughtered, with some knights deserting to the enemy, and narrowly escaping, only to be regarded as a traitor and coward. Guy of Lusignan was one of the few captives of Saladin's after the battle, along with Raynald of Châtillon and Humphrey IV of Toron. Raynald was beheaded, settling an old score. Guy and Humphrey were imprisoned in Damascus and later released in 1188.

As a result of his victory, much of Palestine quickly fell to Saladin. The siege of Jerusalem began on 20 September 1187 and the Holy City was surrendered to Saladin by Balian of Ibelin on 2 October. According to some, on 19October 1187, Urban III died upon of hearing of the defeat. Jerusalem was once again in Muslim hands. Many in the kingdom fled to Tyre, and Saladin's subsequent attack at the siege of Tyre beginning in November 1187 was unsuccessful. The later siege of Safed in late 1188 completed Saladin's conquest of the Holy Land.

Third Crusade

The years following the founding of the Kingdom of Jerusalem were met with multiple disasters. The Second Crusade did not achieve its goals, and left the Muslim East in a stronger position with the rise of Saladin. A united Egypt–Syria led to the loss of Jerusalem itself, and Western Europe had no choice but to launch the Third Crusade, this time led by the kings of Europe.

The news of the disastrous defeat at the battle of Hattin and subsequent fall of Jerusalem gradually reached Western Europe. Urban III died shortly after hearing the news, and his successor Gregory VIII issued the bull Audita tremendi on 29 October 1187 describing the events in the East and urging all Christians to take up arms and go to the aid of those in the Kingdom of Jerusalem, calling for a new crusade to the Holy Landthe Third Crusadeto be led by Frederick Barbarossa and Richard I of England.

Frederick took the cross in March 1188. Frederick sent an ultimatum to Saladin, demanding the return of Palestine and challenging him to battle and in May 1189, Frederick's host departed for Byzantium. In March 1190, Frederick embarked to Asia Minor. The armies coming from western Europe pushed on through Anatolia, defeating the Turks and reaching as far as Cilician Armenia. On 10 June 1190, Frederick drowned near Silifke Castle. His death caused several thousand German soldiers to leave the force and return home. The remaining German army moved under the command of the English and French forces that arrived shortly thereafter.

Richard the Lionheart had already taken the cross as the Count of Poitou in 1187. His father Henry II of England and Philip II of France had done so on 21 January 1188 after receiving news of the fall of Jerusalem to Saladin. Richard I and Philip II of France agreed to go on the Crusade in January 1188. Arriving in the Holy Land, Richard led his support to the stalemated siege of Acre. The Muslim defenders surrendered on 12 July 1191. Richard remained in sole command of the Crusader force after the departure of Philip II on 31 July 1191. On 20 August 1191, Richard had more than 2000 prisoners beheaded at the massacre of Ayyadieh. Saladin subsequently ordered the execution of his Christian prisoners in retaliation.

Richard moved south, defeating Saladin's forces at the battle of Arsuf on 7 September 1191. Three days later, Richard took Jaffa, held by Saladin since 1187, and advanced inland towards Jerusalem. On 12 December 1191 Saladin disbanded the greater part of his army. Learning this, Richard pushed his army forward, to within 12 miles from Jerusalem before retreating back to the coast. The Crusaders made another advance on Jerusalem, coming within sight of the city in June before being forced to retreat again. Hugh III of Burgundy, leader of the Franks, was adamant that a direct attack on Jerusalem should be made. This split the Crusader army into two factions, and neither was strong enough to achieve its objective. Without a united command the army had little choice but to retreat back to the coast.

On 27 July 1192, Saladin's army began the battle of Jaffa, capturing the city. Richard's forces stormed Jaffa from the sea and the Muslims were driven from the city. Attempts to retake Jaffa failed and Saladin was forced to retreat. On 2 September 1192 Richard and Saladin entered into the Treaty of Jaffa, providing that Jerusalem would remain under Muslim control, while allowing unarmed Christian pilgrims and traders to freely visit the city. This treaty ended the Third Crusade.

Three years later, Henry VI launched the Crusade of 1197. While his forces were en route to the Holy Land, Henry VI died in Messina on 28 September 1197. The nobles that remained captured the Levant coast between Tyre and Tripoli before returning to Germany. The Crusade ended on 1 July 1198 after capturing Sidon and Beirut.

Fourth Crusade

In 1198, the recently elected Pope Innocent III announced a new crusade, organised by three Frenchmen: Theobald of Champagne; Louis of Blois; and Baldwin of Flanders. After Theobald's premature death, the Italian Boniface of Montferrat replaced him as the new commander of the campaign. They contracted with the Republic of Venice for the transportation of 30,000 crusaders at a cost of 85,000 marks. However, many chose other embarkation ports and only around 15,000 arrived in Venice. The Doge of Venice Enrico Dandolo proposed that Venice would be compensated with the profits of future conquests beginning with the seizure of the Christian city of Zara. Pope Innocent III's role was ambivalent. He only condemned the attack when the siege started. He withdrew his legate to disassociate from the attack but seemed to have accepted it as inevitable. Historians question whether for him, the papal desire to salvage the crusade may have outweighed the moral consideration of shedding Christian blood. The crusade was joined by King Philip of Swabia, who intended to use the Crusade to install his exiled brother-in-law, Alexios IV Angelos, as Emperor. This required the overthrow of Alexios III Angelos, the uncle of AlexiosIV. Alexios IV offered the crusade 10,000 troops, 200,000 marks and the reunion of the Greek Church with Rome if they toppled his uncle Emperor Alexios III. When the crusade entered Constantinople, AlexiosIII fled and was replaced by his nephew. The Greek resistance prompted AlexiosIV to seek continued support from the crusade until he could fulfil his commitments. This ended with his murder in a violent anti-Latin revolt. The crusaders were without seaworthy ships, supplies or food. Their only escape route was through the city, taking by force what Alexios had promised and the new anti-westerner Byzantine rulerAlexios V Doukasdenied them. The Sack of Constantinople involved three days of pillaging churches and killing much of the Greek Orthodox Christian populace. This sack was not unusual considering the violent military standards of the time, but contemporaries such as Innocent III and Ali ibn al-Athir saw it as an atrocity against centuries of classical and Christian civilisation.

Fifth Crusade

The Fifth Crusade (1217–1221) was a campaign by Western Europeans to reacquire Jerusalem and the rest of the Holy Land by first conquering Egypt, ruled by the sultan al-Adil, brother of Saladin. In 1213, Innocent III called for another Crusade at the Fourth Lateran Council, and in the papal bull Quia maior. Innocent died in 1216 and was succeeded by Honorius III who immediately called on Andrew II of Hungary and Frederick II of Germany to lead a Crusade. Frederick had taken the cross in 1215, but hung back, with his crown still in contention, and Honorius delayed the expedition.

Andrew II left for Acre in August 1217, joining John of Brienne, king of Jerusalem. The initial plan of a two-prong attack in Syria and in Egypt was abandoned and instead the objective became limited operations in Syria. After accomplishing little, the ailing Andrew returned to Hungary early in 1218. As it became clear that Frederick II was not coming to the east, the remaining commanders began the planning to attack the Egyptian port of Damietta.

The fortifications of Damietta were impressive, and included the Burj al-Silsilahthe chain towerwith massive chains that could stretch across the Nile. The siege of Damietta began in June 1218 with a successful assault on the tower. The loss of the tower was a great shock to the Ayyubids, and the sultan al-Adil died soon thereafter. He was succeeded as sultan by his son al-Kamil. Further offensive action by the Crusaders would have to wait until the arrival of additional forces, including legate Pelagius with a contingent of Romans. A group from England arrived shortly thereafter.

By February 1219, the Crusaders now had Damietta surrounded, and al-Kamil opened negotiations with the Crusaders, asking for envoys to come to his camp. He offered to surrender the kingdom of Jerusalem, less the fortresses of al-Karak and Krak de Montréal, guarding the road to Egypt, in exchange for the evacuation of Egypt. John of Brienne and the other secular leaders were in favor of the offer, as the original objective of the Crusade was the recovery of Jerusalem. But Pelagius and the leaders of the Templars and Hospitallers refused. Later, Francis of Assisi arrived to negotiate unsuccessfully with the sultan.

In November 1219, the Crusaders entered Damietta and found it abandoned, al-Kamil having moved his army south. In the captured city, Pelagius was unable to prod the Crusaders from their inactivity, and many returned home, their vow fulfilled. Al-Kamil took advantage of this lull to reinforce his new camp at Mansurah, renewing his peace offering to the Crusaders, which was again refused. Frederick II sent troops and word that he would soon follow, but they were under orders not to begin offensive operations until he had arrived.

In July 1221, Pelagius began to advance to the south. John of Brienne argued against the move, but was powerless to stop it. Already deemed a traitor for opposing the plans and threatened with excommunication, John joined the force under the command of the legate. In the ensuing Battle of Mansurah in late August, al-Kamil had the sluices along the right bank of the Nile opened, flooding the area and rendering battle impossible. Pelagius had no choice but to surrender.

The Crusaders still had some leverage as Damietta was well-garrisoned. They offered the sultan a withdrawal from Damietta and an eight-year truce in exchange for allowing the Crusader army to pass, the release of all prisoners, and the return of the relic of the True Cross. Prior to the formal surrender of Damietta, the two sides would maintain hostages, among them John of Brienne and Hermann of Salza for the Franks side and a son of al-Kamil for Egypt. The masters of the military orders were dispatched to Damietta, where the forces were resistant to giving up, with the news of the surrender, which happened on 8 September 1221. The Fifth Crusade was over, a dismal failure, unable to even gain the return of the piece of the True Cross.

Sixth Crusade

The Sixth Crusade (1228–1229) was a military expedition to recapture the city of Jerusalem. It began seven years after the failure of the Fifth Crusade and involved very little actual fighting. The diplomatic maneuvering of Frederick II resulted in the Kingdom of Jerusalem regaining some control over Jerusalem for much of the ensuing fifteen years. The Sixth Crusade is also known as the Crusade of Frederick II.

Of all the European sovereigns, only Frederick II, the Holy Roman Emperor, was in a position to regain Jerusalem. Frederick was, like many of the 13th-century rulers, a serial crucesignatus, having taken the cross multiple times since 1215. After much wrangling, an onerous agreement between the emperor and Pope Honorius III was signed on 25 July 1225 at San Germano. Frederick promised to depart on the Crusade by August 1227 and remain for two years. During this period, he was to maintain and support forces in Syria and deposit escrow funds at Rome in gold. These funds would be returned to the emperor once he arrived at Acre. If he did not arrive, the money would be employed for the needs of the Holy Land. Frederick II would go on the Crusade as king of Jerusalem. He married John of Brienne's daughter Isabella II by proxy in August 1225 and they were formally married on 9 November 1227. Frederick claimed the kingship of Jerusalem despite John having been given assurances that he would remain as king. Frederick took the crown in December 1225. Frederick's first royal decree was to grant new privileges on the Teutonic Knights, placing them on equal footing as the Templars and Hospitallers.

After the Fifth Crusade, the Ayyubid sultan al-Kamil became involved in civil war in Syria and, having unsuccessfully tried negotiations with the West beginning in 1219, again tried this approach, offering return of much of the Holy Land in exchange for military support. Becoming pope in 1227, Gregory IX was determined to proceed with the Crusade. The first contingents of Crusaders then sailed in August 1227, joining with forces of the kingdom and fortifying the coastal towns. The emperor was delayed while his ships were refitted. He sailed on 8 September 1227, but before they reached their first stop, Frederick was struck with the plague and disembarked to secure medical attention. Resolved to keep his oath, he sent his fleet on to Acre. He sent his emissaries to inform Gregory IX of the situation, but the pope did not care about Frederick's illness, just that he had not lived up to his agreement. Frederick was excommunicated on 29 September 1227, branded a wanton violator of his sacred oath taken many times.

Frederick made his last effort to be reconciled with Gregory. It had no effect and Frederick sailed from Brindisi in June 1228. After a stop at Cyprus, Frederick II arrived in Acre on 7 September 1228 and was received warmly by the military orders, despite his excommunication. Frederick's army was not large, mostly German, Sicilian and English. Of the troops he had sent in 1227 had mostly returned home. He could neither afford nor mount a lengthening campaign in the Holy Land given the ongoing War of the Keys with Rome. The Sixth Crusade would be one of negotiation.

After resolving the internecine struggles in Syria, al-Kamil's position was stronger than it was a year before when he made his original offer to Frederick. For unknown reasons, the two sides came to an agreement. The resultant Treaty of Jaffa was concluded on 18 February 1229, with al-Kamil surrendering Jerusalem, with the exception of some Muslim holy sites, and agreeing to a ten-year truce. Frederick entered Jerusalem on 17 March 1229 and received the formal surrender of the city by al-Kamil's agent and the next day, crowned himself. On 1 May 1229, Frederick departed from Acre and arrived in Sicily a month before the pope knew that he had left the Holy Land. Frederick obtained from the pope relief from his excommunication on 28 August 1230 at the Treaty of Ceprano.

The results of the Sixth Crusade were not universally acclaimed. Two letters from the Christian side tell differing stories, with Frederick touting the great success of the endeavor and the Latin patriarch painting a darker picture of the emperor and his accomplishments. On the Muslim side, al-Kamil himself was pleased with the accord, but other regarded the treaty as a disastrous event. In the end, the Sixth Crusade successfully returned Jerusalem to Christian rule and had set a precedent, in having achieved success on crusade without papal involvement.

The Crusades of 1239–1241

The Crusades of 1239–1241, also known as the Barons' Crusade, were a series of crusades to the Holy Land that, in territorial terms, were the most successful since the First Crusade. The major expeditions were led separately by Theobald I of Navarre and Richard of Cornwall. These crusades are sometimes discussed along with that of Baldwin of Courtenay to Constantinople.

In 1229, Frederick II and the Ayyubid sultan al-Kamil, had agreed to a ten-year truce. Nevertheless, Gregory IX, who had condemned this truce from the beginning, issued the papal bull Rachel suum videns in 1234 calling for a new crusade once the truce expired. A number of English and French nobles took the cross, but the crusade's departure was delayed because Frederick, whose lands the crusaders had planned to cross, opposed any crusading activity before the expiration of this truce. Frederick was again excommunicated in 1239, causing most crusaders to avoid his territories on their way to the Holy Land.

The French expedition was led by Theobald I of Navarre and Hugh of Burgundy, joined by Amaury of Montfort and Peter of Dreux. On 1 September 1239, Theobald arrived in Acre, and was soon drawn into the Ayyubid civil war, which had been raging since the death of al-Kamil in 1238. At the end of September, al-Kamil's brother as-Salih Ismail seized Damascus from his nephew, as-Salih Ayyub, and recognized al-Adil II as sultan of Egypt. Theobald decided to fortify Ascalon to protect the southern border of the kingdom and to move against Damascus later. While the Crusaders were marching from Acre to Jaffa, Egyptian troops moved to secure the border in what became the Battle at Gaza. Contrary to Theobald's instructions and the advice of the military orders, a group decided to move against the enemy without further delay, but they were surprised by the Muslims who inflicted a devasting defeat on the Franks. The masters of the military orders then convinced Theobald to retreat to Acre rather than pursue the Egyptians and their Frankish prisoners. A month after the battle at Gaza, an-Nasir Dā'ūd, emir of Kerak, seized Jerusalem, virtually unguarded. The internal strife among the Ayyubids allowed Theobald to negotiate the return of Jerusalem. In September 1240, Theobald departed for Europe, while Hugh of Burgundy remained to help fortify Ascalon.

On 8 October 1240, the English expedition arrived, led by Richard of Cornwall. The force marched to Jaffa, where they completed the negotiations for a truce with Ayyubid leaders begun by Theobald just a few months prior. Richard consented, the new agreement was ratified by Ayyub by 8 February 1241, and prisoners from both sides were released on 13 April. Meanwhile, Richard's forces helped to work on Ascalon's fortifications, which were completed by mid-March 1241. Richard entrusted the new fortress to an imperial representative, and departed for England on 3 May 1241.

In July 1239, Baldwin of Courtenay, the young heir to the Latin Empire, travelled to Constantinople with a small army. In the winter of 1239, Baldwin finally returned to Constantinople, where he was crowned emperor around Easter of 1240, after which he launched his crusade. Baldwin then besieged and captured Tzurulum, a Nicaean stronghold seventy-five miles west of Constantinople.

Although the Barons' Crusade returned the kingdom to its largest size since 1187, the gains would be dramatically reversed a few years later. On 15 July 1244, the city was reduced to ruins during the siege of Jerusalem and its Christians massacred by the Khwarazmian army. A few months later, the Battle of La Forbie permanently crippled Christian military power in the Holy Land. The sack of the city and the massacre which accompanied it encouraged Louis IX of France to organize the Seventh Crusade.

The Seventh Crusade

The Seventh Crusade (1248–1254) was the first of the two Crusades led by Louis IX of France. Also known as the Crusade of Louis IX to the Holy Land, its objective was to reclaim the Holy Land by attacking Egypt, the main seat of Muslim power in the Middle East, then under as-Salih Ayyub, son of al-Kamil. The Crusade was conducted in response to setbacks in the Kingdom of Jerusalem, beginning with the loss of the Holy City in 1244, and was preached by Innocent IV in conjunction with a crusade against emperor Frederick II, the Prussian crusades and Mongol incursions.

At the end of 1244, Louis was stricken with a severe malarial infection and he vowed that if he recovered he would set out for a Crusade. His life was spared, and as soon as his health permitted him, he took the cross and immediately began preparations. The next year, the pope presided over First Council of Lyon, directing a new Crusade under the command of Louis. With Rome under siege by Frederick, the pope also issued his Ad Apostolicae Dignitatis Apicem, formally renewing the sentence of excommunication on the emperor, and declared him deposed from the imperial throne and that of Naples.

The recruiting effort under cardinal Odo of Châteauroux was difficult, and the Crusade finally began on 12 August 1248 when Louis IX left Paris under the insignia of a pilgrim, the Oriflamme. With him were queen Margaret of Provence and two of Louis' brothers, Charles I of Anjou and Robert I of Artois. Their youngest brother Alphonse of Poitiers departed the next year. They were followed by Hugh IV of Burgundy, Peter Maulcerc, Hugh XI of Lusignan, royal companion and chronicler Jean de Joinville, and an English detachment under William Longespée, grandson of Henry II of England.

The first stop was Cyprus, arriving in September 1248 where they experienced a long wait for the forces to assemble. Many of the men were lost en route or to disease. The Franks were soon met by those from Acre including the masters of the Orders Jean de Ronay and Guillaume de Sonnac. The two eldest sons of John of Brienne, Alsonso of Brienne and Louis of Brienne, would also join as would John of Ibelin, nephew to the Old Lord of Beirut. William of Villehardouin also arrived with ships and Frankish soldiers from the Morea. It was agreed that Egypt was the objective and many remembered how the sultan's father had been willing to exchange Jerusalem itself for Damietta in the Fifth Crusade. Louis was not willing to negotiate with the infidel Muslims, but he did unsuccessfully seek a Franco-Mongol alliance, reflecting what the pope had sought in 1245.

As-Salih Ayyub conducting a campaign in Damascus when the Franks invaded as he had expected the Crusaders to land in Syria. Hurrying his forces back to Cairo , he turned to his vizier Fakhr ad-Din ibn as-Shaikh to command the army that fortified Damietta in anticipation of the invasion. On 5 June 1249 the Crusader fleet began the landing and subsequent siege of Damietta. After a short battle, the Egyptian commander decided to evacuate the city. Remarkably, Damietta had been seized with only one Crusader casualty. The city became a Frankish city and Louis waited until the Nile floods abated before advancing, remembering the lessons of the Fifth Crusade. The loss of Damietta was a shock to the Muslim world, and as-Salih Ayyub offered to trade Damietta for Jerusalem as his father had thirty years before. The offer was rejected. By the end of October 1249 the Nile had receded and reinforcements had arrived. It was time to advance, and the Frankish army set out towards Mansurah.

The sultan died in November 1249, his widow Shajar al-Durr concealing the news of her husband's death. She forged a document which appointed his son al-Muazzam Turanshah, then in Syria, as heir and Fakhr ad-Din as viceroy. But the Crusade continued, and by December 1249, Louis was encamped on the river banks opposite to Mansurah. For six weeks, the armies of the West and Egypt faced each other on opposite sides of the canal, leading to the Battle of Mansurah that would end on 11 February 1250 with an Egyptian defeat. Louis had his victory, but a cost of the loss of much of his force and their commanders. Among the survivors were the Templar master Guillaume de Sonnac, losing an eye, Humbert V de Beaujeu, constable of France, John II of Soissons, and the duke of Brittany, Peter Maulcerc. Counted with the dead were the king's brother Robert I of Artois, William Longespée and most of his English followers, Peter of Courtenay, and Raoul II of Coucy. But the victory would be short-lived. On 11 February 1250, the Egyptians attacked again. Templar master Guillaume de Sonnac and acting Hospitaller master Jean de Ronay were killed. Alphonse of Poitiers, guarding the camp, was encircled and was rescued by the camp followers. At nightfall, the Muslims gave up the assault.

On 28 February 1250, Turanshah arrived from Damascus and began an Egyptian offensive, intercepting the boats that brought food from Damietta. The Franks were quickly beset by famine and disease. The Battle of Fariskur fought on 6 April 1250 would be the decisive defeat of Louis' army. Louis knew that the army must be extricated to Damietta and they departed on the morning of 5 April, with the king in the rear and the Egyptians in pursuit. The next day, the Muslims surrounded the army and attacked in full force. On 6 April, Louis' surrender was negotiated directly with the sultan by Philip of Montfort. The king and his entourage were taken in chains to Mansurah and the whole of the army was rounded up and led into captivity.

The Egyptians were unprepared for the large number of prisoners taken, comprising most of Louis' force. The infirm were executed immediately and several hundred were decapitated daily. Louis and his commanders were moved to Mansurah, and negotiations for their release commenced. The terms agreed to were harsh. Louis was to ransom himself by the surrender of Damietta and his army by the payment of a million bezants (later reduced to 800,000). Latin patriarch Robert of Nantes went under safe-conduct to complete the arrangements for the ransom. Arriving in Cairo, he found Turanshah dead, murdered in a coup instigated by his stepmother Shajar al-Durr. On 6 May, Geoffrey of Sergines handed Damietta over to the Moslem vanguard. Many wounded soldiers had been left behind at Damietta, and contrary to their promise, the Muslims massacred them all. In 1251, the Shepherds' Crusade, a popular crusade formed in 1251, with the objective to free Louis, engulfed France. After his release, Louis went to Acre where he remained until 1254. This is regarded as the end of the Seventh Crusade.

The Last Crusades

After the defeat of the Crusaders in Egypt, Louis remained in Syria until 1254 to consolidate the crusader states. A brutal power struggle developed in Egypt between various Mamluk leaders and the remaining weak Ayyubid rulers. The threat presented by an invasion by the Mongols led to one of the competing Mamluk leaders, Qutuz, seizing the sultanate in 1259 and uniting with another faction led by Baibars to defeat the Mongols at Ain Jalut. The Mamluks then quickly gained control of Damascus and Aleppo before Qutuz was assassinated and Baibers assumed control.

Between 1265 and 1271, Baibars drove the Franks to a few small coastal outposts. Baibars had three key objectives: to prevent an alliance between the Latins and the Mongols, to cause dissension among the Mongols (particularly between the Golden Horde and the Persian Ilkhanate), and to maintain access to a supply of slave recruits from the Russian steppes. He supported Manfred of Sicily's failed resistance to the attack of Charles and the papacy. Dissension in the crusader states led to conflicts such as the War of Saint Sabas. Venice drove the Genoese from Acre to Tyre where they continued to trade with Egypt. Indeed, Baibars negotiated free passage for the Genoese with MichaelVIII Palaiologos, Emperor of Nicaea, the newly restored ruler of Constantinople. In 1270 Charles turned his brother King LouisIX's crusade, known as the Eighth Crusade, to his own advantage by persuading him to attack Tunis. The crusader army was devastated by disease, and Louis himself died at Tunis on 25August. The fleet returned to France. Prince Edward, the future king of England, and a small retinue arrived too late for the conflict but continued to the Holy Land in what is known as Lord Edward's Crusade. Edward survived an assassination attempt, negotiated a ten-year truce, and then returned to manage his affairs in England. This ended the last significant crusading effort in the eastern Mediterranean.

Decline and fall of the Crusader States

The years 1272–1302 include numerous conflicts throughout the Levant as well as the Mediterranean and Western European regions, and many crusades were proposed to free the Holy Land from Mamluk control. These include ones of Gregory X, Charles I of Anjou and Nicholas IV, none of which came to fruition. The major players fighting the Muslims included the kings of England and France, the kingdoms of Cyprus and Sicily, the three Military Orders and Mongol Ilkhanate. The end of Western European presence in the Holy Land was sealed with the fall of Tripoli and their subsequent defeat at the siege of Acre in 1291. The Christian forces managed to survive until the final fall of Ruad in 1302.

The Holy Land would no longer be the focus of the West even though various crusades were proposed in the early years of the fourteenth century. The Knights Hospitaller would conquer Rhodes from Byzantium, making it the center of their activity for a hundred years. The Knights Templar, the elite fighting force in the kingdom, would be disbanded and its knights imprisoned or executed. The Mongols converted to Islam, but disintegrated as a fighting force. The Mamluk sultanate would continue for another century. The Crusades to liberate Jerusalem and the Holy Land were over.

Other crusades

The military expeditions undertaken by European Christians in the 11th, 12th, and 13thcenturies to recover the Holy Land from Muslims provided a template for warfare in other areas that also interested the Latin Church. These included the 12th and 13thcentury conquest of Muslim Al-Andalus by Spanish Christian kingdoms; 12th to 15thcentury German Northern Crusades expansion into the pagan Baltic region; the suppression of non-conformity, particularly in Languedoc during what has become called the Albigensian Crusade and for the Papacy's temporal advantage in Italy and Germany that are now known as political crusades. In the 13th and 14th centuries there were also unsanctioned, but related popular uprisings to recover Jerusalem known variously as Shepherds' or Children's crusades.

Urban II equated the crusades for Jerusalem with the ongoing Catholic invasion of the Iberian Peninsula and crusades were preached in 1114 and 1118, but it was Pope Callixtus II who proposed dual fronts in Spain and the Middle East in 1122. In the spring of 1147, Eugene authorized the expansion of his mission into the Iberian peninsula, equating these campaigns against the Moors with the rest of the Second Crusade. The successful siege of Lisbon, from 1 July to 25 October 1147, was followed by the six-month siege of Tortosa, ending on 30 December 1148 with a defeat for the Moors. In the north, some Germans were reluctant to fight in the Holy Land while the pagan Wends were a more immediate problem. The resulting Wendish Crusade of 1147 was partially successful but failed to convert the pagans to Christianity. By the time of the Second Crusade the three Spanish kingdoms were powerful enough to conquer Islamic territoryCastile, Aragon, and Portugal. In 1212 the Spanish were victorious at the Battle of Las Navas de Tolosa with the support of foreign fighters responding to the preaching of Innocent III. Many of these deserted because of the Spanish tolerance of the defeated Muslims, for whom the Reconquista was a war of domination rather than extermination. In contrast the Christians formerly living under Muslim rule called Mozarabs had the Roman Rite relentlessly imposed on them and were absorbed into mainstream Catholicism. Al-Andalus, Islamic Spain, was completely suppressed in 1492 when the Emirate of Granada surrendered.

In 1147, Pope Eugene III extended Calixtus's idea by authorising a crusade on the German north-eastern frontier against the pagan Wends from what was primarily economic conflict. From the early 13thcentury, there was significant involvement of military orders, such as the Livonian Brothers of the Sword and the Order of Dobrzyń. The Teutonic Knights diverted efforts from the Holy Land, absorbed these orders and established the State of the Teutonic Order. This evolved the Duchy of Prussia and Duchy of Courland and Semigallia in 1525 and 1562, respectively.

By the beginning of the 13thcentury Papal reticence in applying crusades against the papacy's political opponents and those considered heretics. Innocent III proclaimed a crusade against Catharism that failed to suppress the heresy itself but ruined the culture the Languedoc. This set a precedent that was followed in 1212 with pressure exerted on the city of Milan for tolerating Catharism, in 1234 against the Stedinger peasants of north-western Germany, in 1234 and 1241 Hungarian crusades against Bosnian heretics. The historian Norman Housley notes the connection between heterodoxy and anti-papalism in Italy. Indulgence was offered to anti-heretical groups such as the Militia of Jesus Christ and the Order of the Blessed Virgin Mary. Innocent III declared the first political crusade against Frederick II's regent, Markward von Annweiler, and when Frederick later threatened Rome in 1240, Gregory IX used crusading terminology to raise support against him. On Frederick II's death the focus moved to Sicily. In 1263, Pope Urban IV offered crusading indulgences to Charles of Anjou in return for Sicily's conquest. However, these wars had no clear objectives or limitations, making them unsuitable for crusading. The 1281 election of a French pope, MartinIV, brought the power of the papacy behind Charles. Charles's preparations for a crusade against Constantinople were foiled by the Byzantine Emperor Michael VIII Palaiologos, who instigated an uprising called the Sicilian Vespers. Instead, Peter III of Aragon was proclaimed king of Sicily, despite his excommunication and an unsuccessful Aragonese Crusade. Political crusading continued against Venice over Ferrara; Louis IV, King of Germany when he marched to Rome for his imperial coronation; and the free companies of mercenaries.

The Latin states established were a fragile patchwork of petty realms threatened by Byzantine successor statesthe Despotate of Epirus, the Empire of Nicaea and the Empire of Trebizond. Thessaloniki fell to Epirus in 1224, and Constantinople to Nicaea in 1261. Achaea and Athens survived under the French after the Treaty of Viterbo. The Venetians endured a long-standing conflict with the Ottoman Empire until the final possessions were lost in the Seventh Ottoman–Venetian War in the 18thcentury. This period of Greek history is known as the Frankokratia or Latinokratia ("Frankish or Latin rule") and designates a period when western European Catholics ruled Orthodox Byzantine Greeks.

The threat of the expanding Ottoman Empire prompted further campaigns. In 1389, the Ottomans defeated the Serbs at the Battle of Kosovo, won control of the Balkans from the Danube to the Gulf of Corinth, in 1396 defeated French crusaders and King Sigismund of Hungary at the Nicopolis, in 1444 destroyed a crusading Polish and Hungarian force at Varna, four years later again defeated the Hungarians at Kosovo and in 1453 captured Constantinople. The 16thcentury saw growing rapprochement. The Habsburgs, French, Spanish and Venetians and Ottomans all signed treaties. Francis I of France allied with all quarters, including from German Protestant princes and Sultan Suleiman the Magnificent. 

Anti-Christian crusading declined in the 15thcentury, the exceptions were the six failed crusades against the religiously radical Hussites in Bohemia and attacks on the Waldensians in Savoy. Crusading became a financial exercise; precedence was given to the commercial and political objectives. The military threat presented by the Ottoman Turks diminished, making anti-Ottoman crusading obsolete in 1699 with the final Holy League.

Crusading movement

The First Crusade was an unexpected event for contemporary chroniclers, but historical analysis demonstrates it had its roots in developments earlier in the 11thcentury. Clerics and laity increasingly recognised Jerusalem as worthy of penitential pilgrimage. The desire of Christians for a more effective church was evident in increased piety. Pilgrimage to the Holy Land expanded after safer routes through Hungary developed from 1000. There was an increasingly articulate piety within the knighthood and the developing devotional and penitential practises of the aristocracy created a fertile ground for crusading appeals. The papacy's decline in power and influence had left it as little more than a localised bishopric, but its assertion grew under the influence of the Gregorian Reform in the period from the 1050s until the 1080s. The doctrine of papal supremacy conflicted with the view of the Eastern church that considered the pope as only one of the five patriarchs of the Christian Church, alongside the Patriarchates of Alexandria, Antioch, Constantinople and Jerusalem. In 1054 differences in custom, creed, and practice spurred Pope Leo IX to send a delegation to the Patriarch of Constantinople, which ended in mutual excommunication and an East–West Schism.

Military orders
 The military orders were forms of a religious order first established early in the twelfth century with the function of defending Christians, as well as observing monastic vows. The Knights Hospitaller had a medical mission in Jerusalem since before the First Crusade, later becoming a formidable military force supporting the crusades in the Holy Land and Mediterranean. The Knights Templar were founded in 1119 by a band of knights who dedicated themselves to protecting pilgrims enroute to Jerusalem. The Teutonic Knights were formed in 1190 to protect pilgrims in both the Holy Land and Baltic region.

The Hospitallers and the Templars became supranational organisations as papal support led to rich donations of land and revenue across Europe. This, in turn, led to a steady flow of new recruits and the wealth to maintain multiple fortifications in the crusader states. In time, they developed into autonomous powers in the region. After the fall of Acre the Hospitallers relocated to Cyprus, then ruled Rhodes until the island was taken by the Ottomans in 1522. While there was talk of merging the Templars and Hospitallers in by Clement V, but ultimately the Templars were charged with heresy and disbanded. The Teutonic Knights supported the later Prussian campaigns into the fifteenth century.

Art and architecture

According to the historian Joshua Prawer no major European poet, theologian, scholar or historian settled in the crusader states. Some went on pilgrimage, and this is seen in new imagery and ideas in western poetry. Although they did not migrate east themselves, their output often encouraged others to journey there on pilgrimage.

Historians consider the crusader military architecture of the Middle East to demonstrate a synthesis of the European, Byzantine and Muslim traditions and to be the most original and impressive artistic achievement of the crusades. Castles were a tangible symbol of the dominance of a Latin Christian minority over a largely hostile majority population. They also acted as centres of administration. Modern historiography rejects the 19th-century consensus that Westerners learnt the basis of military architecture from the Near East, as Europe had already experienced rapid development in defensive technology before the First Crusade. Direct contact with Arab fortifications originally constructed by the Byzantines did influence developments in the east, but the lack of documentary evidence means that it remains difficult to differentiate between the importance of this design culture and the constraints of situation. The latter led to the inclusion of oriental design features such as large water reservoirs and the exclusion of occidental features such as moats.

Typically, crusader church design was in the French Romanesque style. This can be seen in the 12th-century rebuilding of the Holy Sepulchre. It retained some of the Byzantine details, but new arches and chapels were built to northern French, Aquitanian, and Provençal patterns. There is little trace of any surviving indigenous influence in sculpture, although in the Holy Sepulchre the column capitals of the south facade follow classical Syrian patterns.

In contrast to architecture and sculpture, it is in the area of visual culture that the assimilated nature of the society was demonstrated. Throughout the 12thand 13thcenturies the influence of indigenous artists was demonstrated in the decoration of shrines, paintings and the production of illuminated manuscripts. Frankish practitioners borrowed methods from the Byzantines and indigenous artists and iconographical practice leading to a cultural synthesis, illustrated by the Church of the Nativity. Wall mosaics were unknown in the west but in widespread use in the crusader states. Whether this was by indigenous craftsmen or learnt by Frankish ones is unknown, but a distinctive original artistic style evolved.

Manuscripts were produced and illustrated in workshops housing Italian, French, English and local craftsmen leading to a cross-fertilisation of ideas and techniques. An example of this is the Melisende Psalter, created by several hands in a workshop attached to the Holy Sepulchre. This style could have both reflected and influenced the taste of patrons of the arts. But what is seen is an increase in stylised, Byzantine-influenced content. This extended to the production of icons, unknown at the time to the Franks, sometimes in a Frankish style and even of western saints. This is seen as the origin of Italian panel painting. While it is difficult to track illumination of manuscripts and castle design back to their origins, textual sources are simpler. The translations made in Antioch are notable, but they are considered of secondary importance to the works emanating from Muslim Spain and from the hybrid culture of Sicily.

Finance of the Crusades
Crusade finance and taxation left a legacy of social, financial, and legal institutions. Property became available while coinage and precious materials circulated more readily within Europe. Crusading expeditions created immense demands for food supplies, weapons, and shipping that benefited merchants and artisans. Levies for crusades contributed to the development of centralised financial administrations and the growth of papal and royal taxation. This aided development of representative bodies whose consent was required for many forms of taxation. The Crusades strengthened exchanges between oriental and occidental economic spheres. The transport of pilgrims and crusaders notably benefitted Italian maritime cities, such as the trio of Venice, Pisa, and Genoa. Having obtained commercial privileges in the fortified places of Syria, they became the favoured intermediaries for trade in goods such as silk, spices, as well as other raw alimentary goods and mineral products. Trade with the Muslim world was thus extended beyond existing limits. Merchants were further advantaged by technological improvements, and long-distance trade as a whole expanded. The increased volume of goods being traded through ports of the Latin Levant and the Muslim world made this the cornerstone of a wider middle-eastern economy, as manifested in important cities along the trade routes, such as Aleppo, Damascus and Acre. It became increasingly common for European merchants to venture further east, and business was conducted fairly despite religious differences, and continued even in times of political and military tensions.

Legacy
The Crusades created national mythologies, tales of heroism, and a few place names. Historical parallelism and the tradition of drawing inspiration from the Middle Ages have become keystones of political Islam encouraging ideas of a modern jihad and a centuries-long struggle against Christian states, while secular Arab nationalism highlights the role of western imperialism. Modern Muslim thinkers, politicians and historians have drawn parallels between the crusades and political developments such as the establishment of Israel in 1948. Right-wing circles in the western world have drawn opposing parallels, considering Christianity to be under an Islamic religious and demographic threat that is analogous to the situation at the time of the crusades. Crusader symbols and anti-Islamic rhetoric are presented as an appropriate response. These symbols and rhetoric are used to provide a religious justification and inspiration for a struggle against a religious enemy.

Historiography

The historiography of the Crusades is concerned with their "history of the histories" during the Crusader period. The subject is a complex one, with overviews provided in Select Bibliography of the Crusades, Modern Historiography, and Crusades (Bibliography and Sources). The histories describing the Crusades are broadly of three types: (1) The primary sources of the Crusades, which include works written in the medieval period, generally by participants in the Crusade or written contemporaneously with the event, letters and documents in archives, and archaeological studies; (2) secondary sources, beginning with early consolidated works in the 16th century and continuing to modern times; and (3) tertiary sources, primarily encyclopedias, bibliographies and genealogies.

Primary sources. The primary sources for the Crusades are generally presented in the individual articles on each Crusade and summarized in the list of sources for the Crusades. For the First Crusade, the original Latin chronicles, including the Gesta Francorum, works by Albert of Aachen and Fulcher of Chartres, The Alexiad by Byzantine princess Anna Komnene, the Complete Work of History by Muslim historian Ali ibn al-Athir, and the Chronicle of Armenian historian Matthew of Edessa, provide for a starting point for the study of the Crusades' historiography. Many of these and related texts are found in the collections Recueil des historiens des croisades (RHC) and Crusade Texts in Translation. The work of William of Tyre, Historia Rerum in Partibus Transmarinis Gestarum, and its continuations by later historians complete the foundational work of the traditional Crusade. Some of these works also provide insight into the later Crusades and Crusader states. Other works of note include:

 Eyewitness accounts of the Second Crusade by Odo of Deuil and Otto of Freising. The Arab view from Damascus is provided by ibn al-Qalanisi.
 Works on the Third Crusade such as Libellus de Expugnatione Terrae Sanctae per Saladinum expeditione, the Itinerarium Regis Ricardi, and the works of Crusaders Tageno and Roger of Howden, and the narratives of Richard of Devizes, Ralph de Diceto, Ralph of Coggeshall and Arnold of Lübeck. The Arabic works by al-Isfahani and al-Maqdisi as well as the biography of Saladin by Baha ad-Din ibn Shaddad are also of interest.
 The Fourth Crusade is described in the Devastatio Constantinopolitana and works of Geoffrey of Villehardouin, in his chronicle De la Conquête de Constantinople, Robert de Clari and Gunther of Pairis. The view of Byzantium is provided by Niketas Choniates and the Arab perspective is given by Abū Shāma and Abu'l-Fida.
 The history of the Fifth and Sixth Crusades is well represented in the works of Jacques de Vitry, Oliver of Paderborn and Roger of Wendover, and the Arabic works of Badr al-Din al-Ayni.
 Key sources for the later Crusades include Gestes des Chiprois, Jean de Joinville's Life of Saint Louis, as well as works by Guillaume de Nangis, Matthew Paris, Fidentius of Padua and al-Makrizi.

After the fall of Acre, the crusades continued in through the 16th century. Principal references on this subject are the Wisconsin Collaborative History of the Crusades and Norman Housley's The Later Crusades, 1274-1580: From Lyons to Alcazar. Complete bibliographies are also given in these works.

Secondary sources. The secondary sources of the Crusades began in the 16th century, with the first use of the term crusades was by 17th century French historian Louis Maimbourg in his Histoire des Croisades pour la délivrance de la Terre Sainte.  Notable works of the 18th century include Voltaire's Histoire des Croisades, and Edward Gibbon's Decline and Fall of the Roman Empire, excerpted as The Crusades, A.D. 1095–1261 and published in 1870. This edition also includes an essay on chivalry by Sir Walter Scott, whose works helped popularize the Crusades. Early in the 19th century, the monumental Histoire des Croisades was published by the French historian Joseph François Michaud, a major new narrative based on original sources.

These histories have provided evolving views of the Crusades as discussed in detail in the Historiography writeup in Crusading movement. Modern works that serve as secondary source material are listed in the Bibliography section below and need no further discussion here.

Tertiary sources. Three such works are: Louis Bréhier's multiple works on the Crusades in the Catholic Encyclopedia; the works of Ernest Barker in the Encyclopædia Britannica (11th edition), later expanded into a separate publication; and The Crusades: An Encyclopedia (2006), edited by historian Alan V. Murray.

See also
 Criticism of crusading
 History of Christianity
 History of the Knights Hospitaller in the Levant
 History of the Knights Templar
 List of Crusades to Europe and the Holy Land
 Military history of the Crusader states
 Women in the Crusades

References

Bibliography

 
 
 
 
 
 
 
 
 
 
 
 
 
 
 
 
 
 
 
  
 
 
 
 
 
 
 

 
 
 
 
 
 
 
 
 
 
 
 
 
 
 
 
 
 
 
 
 
 
 
 
 
 
 
 

 
Catholicism and Islam
Catholicism-related controversies
Christianity-related controversies
Islam-related controversies
Judaism-related controversies
Medieval Asia
Medieval Africa
Medieval European scribes
Medieval history of the Middle East